Ilhéu Grande is an uninhabited island of Cape Verde. It is 96 m high. The islet forms a part of the integral nature reserve Ilhéus do Rombo.

The islet is a volcanic seamount and has a rocky coastline. It is mostly barren but has some scattered vegetation. Large bird colonies must have existed formerly as the island has thick layers of guano. It has been used by goat farmers and whalers in the past. The islet was mentioned as "Juan Carnira" in the 1747 map by Jacques-Nicolas Bellin.

References 

Uninhabited islands of Cape Verde